Al Día was a sport newspaper published in Costa Rica. The paper was part of La Nación Media Group, which also owns La Nacion. Al Día was a national newspaper and had several regional editions. The paper ceased publication on 30 November 2014.

References

External links
Official website

2014 disestablishments in Costa Rica
Defunct newspapers published in Costa Rica
Newspapers published in Costa Rica
Publications with year of establishment missing
Publications disestablished in 2014
Sports mass media in Costa Rica
Sports newspapers
Spanish-language newspapers